Horwang School is a state school located in Bangkok, Thailand.

History 
After King Rama V appointed the Crown Prince to replace the role of the Na Palace, he appointed His Royal Highness Crown Prince Prince Maha Vajirunhis. His Majesty was pleased to build a palace in Pathumwan field called "Windsor Palace", commonly known as "Phra Tamnak Hor Wang" because it is a building with a high tower.

After Vajirunhis died unexpectedly due to typhoid fever at the age of 16, the palace was converted from a residence to a school for the Civil Service of His Majesty King Chulalongkorn Has, who enshrined the school as Chulalongkorn University on March 26, 1916. In 1935, the Department of Physical Education entered into a land lease agreement in Wang Mai Subdistrict, and demolishing the university building to build a national stadium called Horwang Secondary School of Chulalongkorn University.

Until 1938, Chulalongkorn University was temporarily moved to a new school building on Phayathai Road. After dissolving Hor Wang Secondary School, Triam Udom Suksa School was established to be consistent with the national education plan. In 1966, alumni from Horwang Secondary School of Chulalongkorn University came together to establish a High School Alumni Association for Chulalongkorn University and decided at a meeting of the board of directors that the school should be restored to be a gathering place for former students. This school was referred to as Bangkhen Wittaya School until the Ministry of Education was established on January 9, 1996. On January 31, 1968, the Ministry of Education announced that Bangkhen Witthaya School would be renamed to Horwang School effective from November 27, 1967.

Horwang School has passed the third round of educational assessment from the Office of the Basic Education Commission. Upon accreditation in 2011, the assessment of educational quality was found to be 1 in 8 for special quality schools in Bangkok and 1 in 16 for special quality schools in Thailand.

List of administrators

References

Educational institutions established in 1966
Schools in Bangkok
1966 establishments in Thailand
Chatuchak district